New Gretna (pronounced //) is an unincorporated community located within Bass River Township in Burlington County, New Jersey, United States. The area is served as United States Postal Service ZIP Code 08224.

As of the 2010 United States Census, the population for ZIP Code Tabulation Area 08224 was 573. The population for the ZCTA as of the 2000 United States Census was 543.

The Bead Wreck Site at New Gretna is listed on the National Register of Historic Places as site #88001899.

New Gretna was named after Gretna Green in Scotland.

Demographics

Transportation

New Jersey Transit provides bus service to and from Atlantic City on the 559 route. New Gretna is served by exits 50 and 52 of the Garden State Parkway.

References

External links

Census 2000 Fact Sheet for Zip Code Tabulation Area 08224 from the United States Census Bureau

Bass River Township, New Jersey
Populated places in the Pine Barrens (New Jersey)
Unincorporated communities in Burlington County, New Jersey
Unincorporated communities in New Jersey